Indira: India's Most Powerful Prime Minister is a 2017 biography of Indira Gandhi, Indian politician and former prime minister of India, by Sagarika Ghose. The book rights were bought by Indian actress Vidya Balan and the biography is in the process of being adapted into a web series.

References

External links

 
 Indira: India's Most Powerful Prime Minister at Goodreads
 Indira: India's Most Powerful Prime Minister at Juggernaut Books

2017 non-fiction books
21st-century Indian books
Indian biographies
Indian non-fiction books
Indira Gandhi
Cultural depictions of Indira Gandhi
Indira Gandhi administration
Juggernaut Books books